25 Park Place, formerly the Trust Company of Georgia Building and later the SunTrust Bank Building is a  28-story skyscraper owned by Georgia  State University in Downtown Atlanta. Built across from Woodruff Park, construction was finished in 1971 as the headquarters for Trust Company of Georgia, which was bought by SunTrust in 1985. It was acquired by Georgia State University in 2007, and houses many departments in the College of Arts and Sciences.

See also
 List of tallest buildings in Atlanta

References

Office buildings completed in 1971
Bank company headquarters in the United States
Office buildings in Atlanta
Carson and Lundin buildings